Metanx is a prescription medical food made by Alfasigma that contains L-methylfolate (as Metafolin, a calcium salt of vitamin B9), methylcobalamin (vitamin B12) and pyridoxal 5'-phosphate (vitamin B6).  It is a vitamin B supplement.  Metanx is indicated for the dietary management of peripheral neuropathy (i.e. DPN).

Ingredients 
Metanx contains the following active ingredients (per capsule):
 Folate
 L-methylfolate (Metafolin): 3 mg
 Pyridoxal 5'-phosphate: 35 mg
 Methylcobalamin: 2 mg

Indication and usage 
Metanx is used for treating:
 Painful diabetic neuropathy,
 Diabetic foot ulcers,
 Endothelial dysfunction  associated with diabetic peripheral neuropathy,
 Hyperhomocysteinemia.

References 

B vitamins
Medical food